Abbas Shoukat (born 13 April 1998) is a Pakistani male professional squash player. He achieved his highest career ranking of 214 in January 2016 during the 2016 PSA World Tour.

References 

1998 births
Living people
Pakistani male squash players
Sportspeople from Peshawar
Racket sportspeople from Peshawar